Avonmore is the fifteenth studio album by English singer Bryan Ferry, released on 17 November 2014 by BMG Rights Management.

Background
The album was named after the location of Ferry's studio in London where it was recorded.
The album was announced on 23 September 2014 with a preview of the song "Loop De Li". The album was produced by Ferry with long-term collaborator Rhett Davies, who has produced several albums for Ferry and Roxy Music. The album also features Ferry regulars such as Fonzi Thornton, Nile Rodgers, Marcus Miller, and Johnny Marr (who co-wrote the track "Soldier of Fortune"). The album includes two cover versions, a rendition of Stephen Sondheim's "Send in the Clowns" and a version of "Johnny and Mary", originally by Robert Palmer. The latter track was a collaboration with the Norwegian DJ/producer Todd Terje and first appeared on Terje's album It's Album Time which was released earlier in 2014.

Avonmore peaked at number 19 on the UK Albums Chart, and number 72 on the US Billboard 200.

Critical reception
Reception of the album was generally positive. In a four-out-of-five-stars review, AllMusic critic Stephen Thomas Erlewine wrote that "this is Ferry's prime, a moment when his legacy was intact but yet to be preserved in amber" and that the album "consciously evokes this distinct period, sometimes sighing into the exquisite ennui of Avalon but usually favouring the fine tailoring of Boys and Girls, a record where every sequenced rhythm, keyboard, and guitar line blended into an alluring urbane pulse" and that "the songs are what makes this record something more than a fling". PopMatters critic John Paul wrote that the album "functions as a well-deserved victory lap for both Ferry and those he’s assembled, triumphantly returning to relevance and reminding listeners he’s been doing this since the '70s. It's just taken this long for the mainstream to catch up with where he's been all along". Writer T. Cole Rachel from Pitchfork was less positive, giving the album 6.7 out of 10, writing that the album, in places, "flounders when the music, which routinely flirts with a kind of adult contemporary smoothness, leans over into blandness" and stating that "Ferry's well-documented good taste is both an asset and possibly a curse" and concluding that the record is "a fine addition to Bryan Ferry's oeuvre, if not necessarily a terribly challenging one".

Special edition
On 29 October 2015, Ferry announced the release of the a special edition package of Avonmore, containing the album on vinyl and CD, along with a 48-page book of photos by photographer Matthew Becker.

Track listing

Personnel

"Loop De Li"
 Bryan Ferry – vocals, keyboards
 Neil Hubbard, Steve Jones, Johnny Marr, Nile Rodgers, Oliver Thompson and David Williams – guitars
 Marcus Miller – bass
 Tara Ferry – drums
 John Moody – oboe
 Richard White – saxophone
 Bobbie Gordon, Hannah Khemoh, Laura Mann, Emily Panic, Jodie Scantlebury and Fonzi Thornton – backing vocals

"Midnight Train"
 Bryan Ferry – vocals, keyboards
 Neil Hubbard, Steve Jones, Johnny Marr, Nile Rodgers, Jacob Quistgaard, Chris Spedding, Jeff Thall, Oliver Thompson and David Williams – guitars
 Marcus Miller and Guy Pratt – bass
 Tara Ferry and Andy Newmark – drums
 Fonzi Thornton – backing vocals

"Soldier of Fortune"
 Bryan Ferry – vocals, keyboards
 Paul Beard – keyboards
 Neil Hubbard, Steve Jones and Johnny Marr – guitars 
 Marcus Miller – bass
 Tara Ferry – drums
 Iain Dixon, Robert Fowler and Richard White – saxophones 
 Fonzi Thornton – backing vocals

"Driving Me Wild"
 Bryan Ferry – vocals, keyboards
 Neil Hubbard, Johnny Marr, Nile Rodgers and Oliver Thompson – guitars
 Marcus Miller and Guy Pratt – bass
 Tara Ferry – drums
 Cherisse Osei – percussion
 Richard White – saxophone
 Fonzi Thornton – backing vocals

"A Special Kind of Guy"
 Bryan Ferry – vocals, keyboards
 Neil Hubbard, Steve Jones and Nile Rodgers – guitars
 Marcus Miller and Guy Pratt – bass
 Tara Ferry – drums
 Fonzi Thornton – backing vocals

"Avonmore"
 Bryan Ferry – vocals, keyboards
 Neil Hubbard, Steve Jones, Johnny Marr, Nile Rodgers and Oliver Thompson – guitars 
 Flea, Guy Pratt and Paul Turner – bass
 Tara Ferry and Cherisse Osei – drums
 Frank Ricotti – percussions
 Richard White – alto saxophone

"Lost"
 Bryan Ferry – vocals, keyboards
 Neil Hubbard and Mark Knopfler – guitars
 Neil Jason – bass
 Tara Ferry, Andy Newmark and  Cherisse Osei – drums

"One Night Stand"
 Bryan Ferry – vocals, keyboards
 Paul Beard – keyboards
 Neil Hubbard, Steve Jones, Johnny Marr, Nile Rodgers, Jacob Quistgaard, Chris Spedding, Jeff Thall, Oliver Thompson and David Williams – guitars
 Marcus Miller – bass
 Tara Ferry – drums
 Maceo Parker – alto saxophone
 Sewuse Abwa,  Michelle John, Hannah Khemoh, Ronnie Spector and Shar White – backing vocals

"Send in the Clowns"
 Bryan Ferry – vocals, string arrangements
 Colin Good – acoustic piano, string arrangements
 Johnny Marr – guitars
 Marcus Miller – bass
 Chris Laurence and Tom Wheatley – double bass
 Tara Ferry and Cherisse Osei - drums
 Frank Ricotti – percussions
 Richard White – alto saxophone
 Enrico Tomasso – trumpet

"Johnny and Mary"
 Bryan Ferry – vocals, acoustic piano
 Todd Terje – synthesizers, programming
 Oliver Thompson – guitars
 Cherisse Osei – drums
 Hanne Hukkelberg – backing vocals

Technical
 Chris Mullings – engineer
 Pete Wells – engineer
 Simon Willey – engineer
 Tim Roe – additional engineer
 Mark Knight – assistant engineer
 Craig Silvey – mixing
 Eduardo Paz – mix assistant
 Adam Ayan – mastering at Gateway Mastering (Portland, Maine)
 Isaac Ferry – executive producer
 Tara Ferry – executive producer

Artwork
 Johnny Dewe Mathews – cover photography
 Neil Kirk – inner sleeve photography
 Michael Knight – design
 Jono Patrick – digital artwork
 Richard White – liner notes

Charts

References

2014 albums
Albums produced by Rhett Davies
Bryan Ferry albums